Jonny Addis (born 27 September 1992) is a footballer from Northern Ireland who plays for Cliftonville in the NIFL Premiership.

Club career

Carrick Rangers
In Addis’ first season with Carrick Rangers, they finished top of the NIFL Championship and therefore were promoted to the NIFL Premiership. Although now an established centre-half, Addis played both up front and centre-half during his time at Carrick Rangers.

Glentoran
Glentoran announced the signing of Addis in June 2013. Addis was part of the Glentoran squad which won the 2014-15 Irish Cup, with Addis coming on as a substitute late in the final against Portadown. In July 2016, Addis signed a new two-year deal with Glentoran. He left the club in 2018.

Ballymena United
Ballymena United announced the signing of Addis on a two-year in May 2018. During his time at Ballymena, the Sky Blues made it to the 2018-19 League Cup Final, and were defeated 1-0 by Linfield. One year later, Addis’ Ballymena side were defeated 2-1 by Cliftonville in a dramatic County Antrim Shield final in January 2020. Addis left Ballymena in 2021.

Cliftonville
Addis signed for Cliftonville in the summer of 2021, and quickly became a fan favourite due to impressive performances. He scored his first goal for the Reds in October 2021 in a NIFL League Cup fixture against Ards. On 26 February 2022, Addis scored his first Irish League goal for Cliftonville against Crusaders in the North Belfast Derby.

Honours
Carrick Rangers
NIFL Championship: 2010-11

Glentoran
Irish Cup : 2014-15
NIFL Charity Shield : 2015-16

Cliftonville
Irish League Cup: 2021-22

References

1992 births
Living people
People from Newry
Association footballers from Northern Ireland
Association football defenders
Carrick Rangers F.C. players
Glentoran F.C. players
Ballymena United F.C. players
Cliftonville F.C. players
NIFL Premiership players